Pradip Ghosh (15 August 1942 – 16 October 2020) was a Bengali elocutionist. His father, elocutionist Chinmoy Jeeban Ghosh, introduced him to the art of recitation at the age of three. Ghosh was a pioneer, who made recitation widely accepted within the cultural milieu of Bengal during the 1960s.

Profession
He worked as Joint Director in the Department of Information and Cultural Affairs of Government of West Bengal.

Elocution
Elocution was passion for Ghosh since his early years. He was one of the pioneers in popularizing elocution and recitation in Bengali. He had a great friendship with Kazi Sabyasachi, son of Kazi Nazrul Islam, and many times they shared stage and performed elocution in cultural programs together. Pradip Ghosh will be remembered for his inimitable style of recitation. His recitations are available in innumerable albums in CDs and Cassettes. Recitation of কামাল পাশা (Kamal Pasha - a poem written by Kazi Nazrul Islam) and দেবতার গ্রাস (Debotar Gras - a poem written by Rabindranath Tagore) were amongst many of his notable creations. Ghosh's rendition of Tagore poems touched heart of millions. He was associated with many cultural organisations including Banichakra and Surbharati Sangeet Parishad.

Awards
Ghosh was the recipient of Kazi Sabyasachi Award by Government of West Bengal in 2016.

Autograph
He was known to give autograph in an artistic manner.

Death
On 16 October Ghosh died at 6.40 am in his residence at Jodhpur Park. He was suffering from fever. Blood report received after his death confirmed that he was COVID-19 positive. Survived by his daughter Pritha Ghosh, he left behind a legacy of elocution in Bengal through his disciples and students.

References 

1942 births
2020 deaths
Indian spoken word artists
Bengali people
Deaths from the COVID-19 pandemic in India